The current Romanian National Standard SR 13392:2004 establishes two layouts for Romanian keyboards: a "primary" one and a "secondary" one.

The “primary” layout is intended for more traditional users that learned long ago how to type with older, Microsoft-style implementations of the Romanian keyboard. The “secondary” layout is mainly used by programmers and it does not contradict the physical arrangement of keys on a US-style keyboard. The “secondary” arrangement is used as the default one by the majority of Linux distributions.

There are four Romanian-specific characters that are incorrectly implemented in all Microsoft Windows versions before Vista:

  – incorrectly implemented as 
  – incorrectly implemented as 
  – incorrectly implemented as 
  – incorrectly implemented as 

Since Romanian hardware keyboards are not widely available, Cristian Secară has created a driver that allows the Romanian characters to be generated with a US-style keyboard, in all Windows versions previous to Vista. It uses the right AltGr key modifier to generate the characters.

Legacy QWERTZ Windows keyboard 

Before Windows Vista, this keyboard layout was the default for Romanian. From Vista onwards, its name is „Romanian (Legacy) Keyboard”. 

This legacy layout uses the wrong cedilla-based diacritics instead of the correct commabelow-based ones: Ș and Ț. Beware that in some fonts t-cedilla and T-cedilla are rendered using the commabellow accent, e.g. in some Adobe fonts.

References 

Latin-script keyboard layouts
Romanian language